The 1938 Norwegian Football Cup was the 37th season of the Norwegian annual knockout football tournament. The tournament was open for all members of NFF, except those from Northern Norway. The final was played at Briskeby in Hamar on 16 October 1938, and was contested by the defending champions Mjøndalen and the three-time former winners Fredrikstad. Fredrikstad secured their fourth title with a 3-2 win after extra time in the final. Fredrikstad's cup-victory completed the first Norwegian double, having also won the inaugural League of Norway.

First round

|-
|colspan="3" style="background-color:#97DEFF"|Replay

|-
|colspan="3" style="background-color:#97DEFF"|2nd replay

|}

Fredrikstad, Lyn, Djerv, Kristiansund, Lyn (Gjøvik), Fram (Larvik), Viking and Neset had a walkover.

Second round

|-
|colspan="3" style="background-color:#97DEFF"|Replay

|}

Fredrikstad, Lyn, Djerv and Kristiansund had a walkover.

Third round

|-
|colspan="3" style="background-color:#97DEFF"|Replay

|}

Fredrikstad and Lyn had a walkover.

Fourth round

|}

Quarter-finals

|}

Semi-finals

|}

Final

See also
1937–38 League of Norway
1938 in Norwegian football

References

Norwegian Football Cup seasons
Norway
Cup